Malaysian Politicians Say the Darndest Things is a series of Malaysian non-fiction books compiled by Amir Muhammad (director) and published by Matahari Books. Each books takes over 100 humorous, unusual or just interesting quotes from actual Malaysian politicians, complete with source citation, and is illustrated by a different artist.

Vol 1 

Vol 1 was published was launched on 16 September 2007 in Kuala Lumpur, in conjunction with the 44th anniversary of the formation of Malaysia. It was illustrated by Shahril Nizam. 
The most-quoted politician in the book is Dr. Mahathir Mohamad. 
The back-cover blurb reads: "The species called the Malaysian politicians often gets in the news, but sometimes not for the right reasons. Malaysian Politicians Say the Darndest Things is a collection of over 100 quotes that span almost three decades. There are things that make you go hmmm, things that make you go gaga, and things that given you a refreshingly pithy introduction to several issues of their time. It is a jaunty stroll through contemporary Malaysian culture, society and (of course) politics. We are sure there is more to come, which is why this is only Vol. 1."
It was the 9th best-selling local English book of 2007, according to the Popular bookstore chain.

Vol 2 

Vol 2 was published in late 2008 but had its official launch on 14 February 2009, in conjunction with Valentine's Day. It was illustrated by Fahmi Reza, who like Amir is a documentary film maker. It sold 3,000 copies in the first three months alone. 
The most-quoted politician in the book is Samy Vellu. 
The back-cover blurb reads: "The Malaysian politician continues to be a gift that keeps on giving. Hot on the heels of the best-selling Vol.1 of Malaysian Politicians Say the Darndest Things, this compilation is further proof that we don't need to travel far to experience shock and awe. Join us for another dance through some of the top-tapping delights of the past two decades. Some of the quotes are witty and pithy, others are weird and prickly, and still others are just out-of-tune. If all History lessons were this painless, none of us would have ever skipped classes. "
Fahmi used a photo-montage method inspired by the anti-Nazi artist John Heartfield. Amir was a little worried that some of the artwork was too confrontational, and asked for three pages to be altered.

Vol 3 

It has been announced that Vol 3 will be illustrated by Chin Yew and all the quotes will be from the 1960s.

Notes 

Malaysian books
Matahari Books books
Malaysian non-fiction books
Works about Malaysian politicians
Political satire books